Irena Žerjal (born 20 April 1940) is a Slovene poet, writer and translator who also used the pen name Maja Tul in her early work.

Žerjal was born in San Giuseppe della Chiusa in Italy in 1940. She studied Slovene and Russian at the University of Ljubljana. She taught at various Slovene language secondary schools in the Trieste region. She writes poetry and short stories. She was married to the public intellectual, sociologist and politician Jože Pučnik from 1964 to 1969 and lived with him in Hamburg for a while.

Published works

 poetry
 Goreče oljke (Burning Olive Trees), 1969
 Topli gozdovi (Warm Forests), 1972
 Klišarna utopičnih idej (The Cliche Factory of Utopic Ideas), 1974
 Pobegla zvezda (The Fugitive Star), 1977
 Gladež (Famine), 1982
 Alabaster (Alabaster), 1984
 Let morske lastovice (Flight of the Sea Swallow), 1987

 prose
 Tragedijica na Grobljah (The Small Tragedy at Groblje), 1973
 Morje, ribe, asfalt (Sea, Fish, Asphaplt), co-author with Marija Mislej, 1976
 Burja in kamni (The Bora and Stones), co-author with Nadja Švara in Marija Mislej, 1987
 Magnetofonski trak (The Recording Tape), 1994

References

Slovenian women poets
Slovenian poets
Slovenian translators
Living people
Italian Slovenes
1940 births
University of Ljubljana alumni